Montealegre is a surname. Due to the spelling inconsistencies in former times, bearers of this name may be found under Montalegre, too.

The name Montealegre appears during the reign of King Alfonso VIII as a Lordship of Tello Pérez de Meneses whose son  Alfonso Téllez de Meneses "el Viejo" inherited his estates. The Lordship of Montealegre having built a castle which lies in a village by the same name in the province of Valladolid in Spain was situated on the border line of defense with the Kingdom of León.

Montealegre is a Spanish surname of local origin, derived from the place where the initial bearer once lived. This name indicates "one who came from Montealegre", a place name in Cadia, Spain in the municipality of Jerez de San Gionvera in Andalucia, Spain. This place name is derived from the Spanish words "Monte", meaning "Mount" or "Mountain", and "alegre", meaning "happy" or "joyful".

The Military order of Santiago and later King Alfonso X, the Wise granted several rights and privileges to Montealegre. And it soon became part of the Lordship of Alburquerque. It was elevated to a County by Don Enrique Manuel de Villena. Later it belonged to the Guzmán family. During the reign of King Felipe IV a Martin Guzmán y Rojas becomes Marquis de Montealegre.

Early references to this surname record Eusebia de Montealegre, Margarita de Montealegre and Leocadio Maria de Montealegre as members of the Order of Carlos III. The title of Marques de Montealegre was granted to Martin de Guzmán in 1625 by king Felipe IV. The title of Conde de Montealegre was held by Salvador Ricardo de Cavira y Acosta between 1830 - 1857. Jose Joaquin de Montealegre y Andrade, Duque de Montealegre and Marques y Salas, was ambassador to the republic of Venice. His daughter, Margarita de Montealegre, settled in Santiago, Chile.

Notable bearers of this surname include:
 Jose Gabriel Montealegre who was born in Madrid in the seventeenth century and until 1650 he was a lawyer to the Royal Court. He was brought before the Inquisition because of his Lutheran beliefs. 
 Jose Maria Montealegre was a statesman and doctor born in San Jose, Costa Rica in 1815 and died in San Francisco in 1887. Jose Maria Montealegre was President of Costa Rica from 1859 to 1863. 
 Felicia Cohn Montealegre was Chilean-Costa Rican actress. A descendant of Mariano Montealegre, a brother of Jose María Montealegre.  She married Leonard Bernstein, the creator of West Side Story.

References

Surnames